Subterinebrica festivaria is a species of moth of the family Tortricidae. It is found in Tungurahua Province, Ecuador.

The wingspan is about 22 mm.  The ground colour of the forewings is white with an indistinct yellowish admixture. The markings are black. The hindwings are whitish with weak, greyish transverse strigulation (fine streaks).

References

Moths described in 2009
Euliini